Beatrisa "Bebe" Liang (born March 31, 1988) is an American retired figure skater. She is the 2006 Four Continents bronze medalist, 2006 Nebelhorn Trophy champion, and 2007 U.S. national pewter medalist.

Career 
Liang was coached by Tiffany Chin for ten years until 2004.

Making her senior national debut, Liang placed sixth at the 2001 U.S. Championships, at the age of thirteen. She was assigned to the 2002 World Junior Championships and placed fourth. The following season, Liang won a pair of silver medals on the ISU Junior Grand Prix series and qualified for the JGP Final, where she placed fourth. She finished sixth at the 2003 World Junior Championships.

Liang debuted on the senior Grand Prix series in the 2003–04 season, placing fourth at the 2003 Trophée Lalique and fifth at the 2003 Cup of Russia.

In 2004, Liang changed coaches to Christy Ness in Oakland, California, commuting five hours each day. She placed fifth at the 2005 U.S. Championships and was assigned to the 2005 Four Continents Championships where she placed seventh.

In May 2005, Liang changed coaches to Frank Carroll and Ken Congemi at the Toyota Sports Center in El Segundo, California. She won bronze at the 2005 Nebelhorn Trophy and placed fourth at the 2005 Skate America. After another fifth-place finish at the U.S. Championships, Liang was sent to the 2006 Four Continents Championships and won the bronze medal. She was one of four figure skaters featured on the 2006 TLC series Ice Diaries.

In the 2006–07 season, Liang won gold at the 2006 Nebelhorn Trophy and pewter at the 2007 U.S. Championships. The following season, she came in fifth nationally, eleventh at Four Continents, and tenth in her only appearance at the senior World Championships.

Liang retired from competition in 2010.

She is currently the head coach for the Los Angeles Ice Theater Junior Team, previously coaching the Novice Team. She led the Novice team to two National silver medals and 8th place at the 2015 Nations Cup and the Junior team to a pewter medal at the 2016 National Theater on Ice Championships.

Personal life 
Liang is also a pianist. She graduated from California State University, Northridge, with a B.S. in kinesiology and an option in exercise science. She is also a part of C.O.S.M.I.C dance crew. She excels in many genres of dance: ballet, modern, hip hop and contemporary.

Programs

Competitive highlights
GP: Grand Prix; JGP: Junior Grand Prix

References

External links

 
 Bebe Liang at IceNetwork
 

American female single skaters
Figure skaters from Los Angeles
People from Tarzana, Los Angeles
Figure skating reality television participants
1988 births
Living people
American sportspeople of Chinese descent
Four Continents Figure Skating Championships medalists
American sportswomen of Chinese descent
People from Granada Hills, Los Angeles
21st-century American women